Fisseha Desta (21 April 1941 – 7 May 2022) was an Ethiopian military officer and politician who was the first vice president of Ethiopia from 1987 to 1991.

Early life 
Fisseha Desta was born into a family of Tigrayan nobility in Adwa. His family then moved to Addis Ababa in 1947. He joined the Ethiopian Army at the age of 20 and graduated from the Harar Military Academy. Three years later, he joined the Kebur Zabagna (Imperial Bodyguard) and was specifically assigned to the Emperor's Palace. He later received advanced military training in the United States.

Career 
When the Derg came to power in 1974 Fisseha became a senior member of the military committee and rose to the rank of lieutenant colonel. He was in command of the Third Division and had served in Eritrea. In 1979 Fisseha became a member of the Central Committee of COPWE. In 1980 Fisseha traveled to several Arab nations in order to convince them to cease their support to the Eritrean rebels. He met with Saddam Hussein who believed that Muslims were being persecuted in Eritrea, Fisseha used the case of Kurds to explain the Eritrean cause which is when Saddam Hussein recommended federation for Eritrea.

After the formation of the Workers' Party of Ethiopia in 1984, Fisseha was appointed the deputy leader of the WPE and was the head of its administration and justice department. In 1987 after the establishment of the People's Democratic Republic of Ethiopia, Fisseha was appointed vice president, a position he held until 1991.

Later life
In the 1990s Fisseha was sentenced to 20 years in prison for his role in the military dictatorship. He was then released in 2011 on parole.

Death 
Fisseha died at midnight on 7 May 2022 in the capital Addis Ababa. His funeral was held on 8 May 2022, at the Holy Trinity Cathedral in Addis Ababa.

References

1941 births
2022 deaths
Vice presidents of Ethiopia
Ethiopian military personnel
Workers' Party of Ethiopia politicians
People from Adwa